Lecanora subloekoesii is a species of crustose lichen in the family Lecanoraceae. Found in China, it was described as new to science in 2017 by Zun-Tian Zhao and Lei Lü. It has also been collected in mountainous areas of Jilin, Liaoning, and Shanxi Provinces. The epithet subloekoesii refers to its close appearance to Lecanora loekoesii.

See also
List of Lecanora species

References

subloekoesii
Lichen species
Lichens described in 2017
Lichens of China